The Halberstadt C.VIII was a prototype two-seat general-purpose biplane built by Halberstadt during World War I.

Design and development
The C.VIII was a single-bay biplane of wooden construction with shortened wings, an elongated fuselage and a Maybach Mb.IV engine. Test flights were successful and the C.VIII was recommended for mass production, but the end of World War I meant that the C.VIII remained at the prototype stage.

Specifications

See also

References

Further reading
 
 

Biplanes
Single-engined tractor aircraft
1910s German military reconnaissance aircraft
Military aircraft of World War I
C.08
Aircraft first flown in 1918